This page describes the qualifying procedure for the 2012 Individual Speedway Junior World Championship finals.

The 2012 FIM Speedway Under 21 World Championship events will take place from April 29 to June 2, 2012. In a new format approved by the International Motorcycling Federation (FIM), there will be seven final meetings with fourteen permanent riders and two wild cards and two track reserves. The permanent riders was determined in four Qualifying Round and two Semi-Finals.

Qualification system 
The top 7 riders from both SF was automatically qualify for all Final meetings.

Qualifying rounds

Semi-finals

See also 
 2013 Speedway Grand Prix Qualification
 2012 Team Speedway Junior World Championship

References 

Q
Qualification for sports events